WARM (590 kHz) is an AM radio station licensed to the city of Scranton, Pennsylvania, and serving the Scranton-Wilkes Barre radio market. The station is currently owned by Seven Mountains Media.  The station is a Class B AM broadcasting station according to the Federal Communications Commission.  WARM broadcasts with a power of 1,800 watts during the daytime and 430 watts at night with two different directional antenna signal patterns for each.  Both antenna patterns are aimed primarily towards the southeast with some signal aimed towards the northwest from its transmitting facility located 15 miles northwest of Scranton in Falls, Pennsylvania.  WARM uses three, originally five, 495 feet high broadcasting towers to transmit its signal from that location; the change to three towers occurred concurrently with a reduction in power from 5,000 watts.

History
WARM has a long and distinguished history in northeastern Pennsylvania broadcasting.  It was the predominant Top 40 format music station in the area during the 1960s and into the 1970s.  It was known during this era as "The Mighty 590". WARM has held its original call sign since it signed on the AM broadcast band in 1940.  However, the station originally broadcast on a frequency of 1400 kHz during its early years.  The station was an affiliate of the ABC radio network since the 1940s. After Citadel Broadcasting bought ABC Radio Networks in 2007, WARM became an ABC Radio O&O station. Citadel merged with Cumulus Media on September 16, 2011. The station used to derive a portion of its programming from Scott Shannon's The True Oldies Channel.

For a time in April 2009, WARM left the air due to transmitter problems; the station then announced that it had no plans to return. The host of the station's polka show told a reporter, "Unless there's a miracle, they ain't coming back."  However, on April 23, WARM returned to the air, still airing its oldies format. On September 15, 2014, WARM went silent again, due to a transmitter failure. On November 24, 2014, an application was filed with the FCC to lower power from 5,000 watts during day and night to 1,800 watts daytime and 430 watts night-time using 3 of the 5 towers. The station resumed broadcasting in December 2014 as an affiliate of CBS Sports Radio.

Cumulus sold WARM to Major Keystone on September 24, 2021. On January 19, 2022, after completing the purchase, Major Keystone resold WARM to Seven Mountains Media, and replaced the sports programming with a simulcast of Seven Mountains-owned classic country station WLGD, branded as "Bigfoot Legends".

Previous logo

References

External links
Bigfoot Legends website

Daytime Signal Coverage of WARM According to Radio-Locator.com
Nighttime Signal Coverage of WARM According to Radio-Locator.com

ARM
Radio stations established in 1940
1940 establishments in Pennsylvania
Classic country radio stations in the United States